The Whitinsville Historic District is a historic district on Church, East, Fletcher, Hill, Woodland, Lake, and Water Sts., Castle Hill Rs., and Linwood Avenue in Northbridge, Massachusetts.  The district encompasses the historic 19th century mill village of Whitinsville, which grew up around an 1826 brick mill building (which still stands) erected by Paul Whitin. The Whitin family came to dominate the textile trade in Northbridge, with numerous mill complexes.

In addition to mill buildings and mill worker housing, the district includes the 1938 post office building and the 1913 Whitinsville Social Library.

The district was added to the National Register of Historic Places in 1983. The district has been included as part of the Blackstone River Valley National Historical Park.

Gallery

See also
National Register of Historic Places listings in Worcester County, Massachusetts

References

Historic districts in Worcester County, Massachusetts
Buildings and structures in Northbridge, Massachusetts
National Register of Historic Places in Worcester County, Massachusetts
Historic districts on the National Register of Historic Places in Massachusetts
Blackstone River Valley National Historical Park